Ceramida baraudi is a species of beetle in the Melolonthinae subfamily that can be found in Portugal and Spain.

References

Beetles described in 1981
Beetles of Europe
Endemic insects of the Iberian Peninsula
Melolonthinae